Moore is a ghost town in Brazos County, in the U.S. state of Texas. It is located within the Bryan-College Station metropolitan area.

History
Moore may have first been settled in the early 1900s and may have been named for a local family. There were no population estimates available for Moore.

Geography

Education
Today, Moore is located within the Bryan Independent School District.

References

Ghost towns in Texas